Lord Spencer Stanley Chichester (20 April 1775 – 22 February 1819) was an Anglo-Irish politician. 

Chichester was the son of Arthur Chichester, 1st Marquess of Donegall and Lady Anne Hamilton, daughter of James Hamilton, 5th Duke of Hamilton. He was the Member of Parliament for Belfast in the Irish House of Commons between 1797 and 1798. He then represented Carrickfergus in the House of Commons of the United Kingdom as a Tory between 1802 and his resignation from the Commons in 1807.

References

1775 births
1819 deaths
18th-century Anglo-Irish people
19th-century Anglo-Irish people
Chichester family
Irish MPs 1790–1797
Members of the Parliament of Ireland (pre-1801) for County Antrim constituencies
Members of the Parliament of the United Kingdom for County Antrim constituencies (1801–1922)
Tory MPs (pre-1834)
UK MPs 1802–1806
UK MPs 1806–1807
Younger sons of marquesses